The 2012 United States Senate election in Maine was held on November 6, 2012, alongside a presidential election, other elections to the United States Senate in other states, as well as elections to the United States House of Representatives and various state and local elections. Despite initially declaring her candidacy and being considered the favorite, popular incumbent Republican U.S. Senator Olympia Snowe unexpectedly decided to retire instead of running for reelection to a fourth term.

Independent former Governor Angus King won the open seat with 52.9% of the vote against Republican Charlie Summers and Democrat Cynthia Dill. Following Independent Connecticut Senator Joe Lieberman's retirement from the Senate in 2013, King became the second Independent incumbent U.S. Senator, after Vermont's Bernie Sanders. This was the first U.S. Senate race in Maine since 1988 that was not won by a Republican.

After being elected, King met with Democratic Leader Harry Reid and Republican Leader Mitch McConnell. He then decided to caucus with the Democratic Party. This effectively gave the Democrats a 55-45 Senate majority due to the other Independent, Bernie Sanders, caucusing with the Democrats as well.

Background 

Incumbent Olympia Snowe won re-election to a third term in 2006 with 74.01% of the vote over Democrat Jean Hay Bright and independent Bill Slavick. Due to the unpopularity of some of Snowe's votes among conservative voters, namely for the American Recovery and Reinvestment Act of 2009 and initial support of the Patient Protection and Affordable Care Act, there was speculation that she would face competition in the 2012 Republican primary from more conservative challengers. The Tea Party Express had promised to aid in a primary against Snowe. There had also been speculation that Snowe would switch parties, though she has always denied this. By June 2011, Snowe had officially entered her name with signatures to run in the Republican primary, saying, she "would never switch parties".

However, on February 28, 2012, Snowe announced that she would be retiring from the U.S. Senate at the end of her term, citing the "atmosphere of polarization and 'my way or the highway' ideologies has become pervasive in campaigns and in our governing institutions" as the reason for her retirement. Her announcement opened the door for candidates from all parties, creating a much more contested 2012 election.

The primary election was held on June 12.

Republican primary

Candidates

On ballot 
 Richard A. Bennett, former President of the Maine Senate
 Scott D'Amboise, former Lisbon Falls Selectman
 Deborah Plowman, state senator
 Bruce Poliquin, Maine State Treasurer
 William Schneider, Maine Attorney General
 Charlie Summers, Maine Secretary of State

Withdrew 
 Andrew Ian Dodge, conservative activist (ran as an independent)
 Olympia Snowe, incumbent U.S. senator (retiring)

Declined 
 Steve Abbott, athletic director at the University of Maine and candidate for Governor in 2010
 Peter Cianchette, former United States Ambassador to Costa Rica and nominee for Governor in 2002
 William Cohen, former United States Secretary of Defense and former U.S. Senator
 Peter Mills, executive director of the Maine Turnpike Authority, former state senator and candidate for Governor of Maine in 2002 and 2006
 Kevin Raye, President of the Maine Senate (running for U.S. House of Representatives)

Polling 

Republican primary

Results

Democratic primary

Candidates

On the ballot 
 Cynthia Dill, state senator
 Matthew Dunlap, former Maine Secretary of State
 Jon Hinck, state representative
 Benjamin Pollard, homebuilder

Declined 
 John Baldacci, former governor of Maine and former U.S. Representative
 Emily Cain, Minority leader of the Maine House of Representatives
 Mike Michaud, U.S. Representative
 Chellie Pingree, U.S. Representative and Democratic nominee for the U.S. Senate in 2002

Polling

Results

General election

Candidates 
 Danny Dalton (Non-Party), former federal employee and small business owner
 Cynthia Dill (Democratic), State Senator and former state representative
 Andrew Ian Dodge (Independent), conservative activist affiliated with the Libertarian Party of Maine
 Angus King (Independent), former governor of Maine
 Benjamin Pollard (write-in), homebuilder (lost Democratic primary)
 Charlie Summers (Republican), Secretary of State of Maine and former state senator
 Steve Woods (Independent), Chairman of Yarmouth Town Council and CEO of TideSmart Global

Debates 
Complete video of debate, November 1, 2012 - C-SPAN
Complete video of debate, November 2, 2012 - C-SPAN

Campaign 
The group Maine People's Alliance called on Charles Summers to resign his position as Secretary of State of Maine, stating that it was a conflict of interest for the secretary of state to oversee their own election to another office. They also had concerns over past actions in sending letters to college students about voter registration requirements. A spokesperson for Summers said that he had turned over all election oversight to a deputy Secretary of State, and Summers himself stated that he was not going to resign. No Secretary of State or Maine Attorney General who was seeking higher office in the last 30 years has resigned.

Steve Woods announced on August 1 that, if elected, he would donate his entire Senate salary to Maine charities chosen by an independent committee of business and nonprofit leaders he would appoint. He encouraged Angus King to make a similar pledge; King responded through his spokesperson that he and his wife would continue to donate money to charities, and that all candidates should do so in "the best way they feel they can."

Anti-spoiler proposal 
Steve Woods met with Angus King on June 13 to discuss a proposal by Woods for either man to leave the race if it appeared one or the other was not going to win, in order to avoid being a spoiler candidate. Woods specifically cited the 2010 Maine Gubernatorial election as well as the 2000 presidential election as examples of what could result from a fragmented electorate. King stated that while he had not fully considered Woods' proposal, he didn't think he was a spoiler, in that "If I thought that, I wouldn't be running." Woods said that regardless of whether or not King accepted the proposal, he likely would abide by it and endorse King in late October if it appeared he would not win. Woods did indeed drop out and endorsed King on November 4, stating that King had the "highest degree of integrity to represent all Mainers". Woods' name, however, remained on the ballot.

Campaign spending issues 
On June 13, Angus King held a press conference and stated that he would discourage campaign spending by outside groups if his opponents would agree to do the same. King criticized such spending as "a tidal wave of anonymous campaign expenditures that distort our political process." His proposed agreement was modeled on a similar agreement between Massachusetts Senator Scott Brown and his opponent Elizabeth Warren, which required them, if outside money is spent on their behalf, to donate an equivalent amount of money to the charity of their opponent's choice. Democrat Cynthia Dill criticized the proposal as lacking "detail or substance" but added that she "looked forward to seeing a proposed agreement." Republican Charles Summers did not state whether he would accept King's proposal or not but criticized King for discussing campaign finance instead of issues like the economy and government spending. Andrew Ian Dodge called such an agreement "unworkable", while Steve Woods said he would abide by such an agreement.

In a letter to King, Dill again stated that she was open to an agreement on limiting outside spending in the race, but she also called on King to support measures the candidates can take themselves to limit campaign spending. These include pledging to not finance their campaigns themselves and limiting contributions to $500. Dill also called on King to take stands on a variety of campaign finance legislation, such as the DISCLOSE Act. King told the Bangor Daily News the prior week that he does support increased disclosure requirements for super-PACs, but did not specifically say he supports the DISCLOSE Act. King is so far the only candidate to benefit from super-PAC money, as a group called  spent $24,000 making an online advertisement for King. King stated that as part of his proposal, he would ask the group to take the ads down.

Danny Dalton stated on June 14 that he would not accept any campaign donations whatsoever, in order to assure constituents that he will represent everyone equally.

Steve Woods pledged to not spend more than $1.3 million on his campaign, or roughly $1 per Maine resident, including campaign donations and his own money. He stated, "If I can't get my message out and if the public isn't interested in that message, to spend more would be egregious."

On July 18, King was criticized for attending a fundraiser in Washington, D.C., where he raised money from PACs and other donors. Republicans said King's actions were "the height of hypocrisy" for speaking out against PAC money and raising it at the same time, while Cynthia Dill criticized King as an "insider who is working the system". King defended his actions by stating that he "took no joy" in them but that it was necessary for him to raise money to defend himself in the "dogfight" he expects. King also reiterated his support of changing campaign finance laws and said that he was making no promises to donors.

Endorsements

Fundraising

Top contributors by employer

Top industries

Predictions

Polling 

with Olympia Snowe

with John Baldacci

with Emily Cain

with Matt Dunlap

with Rosa Scarcelli

with Pingree

Three-way matchups

Results

See also 
 2012 United States Senate elections
 2012 United States House of Representatives elections in Maine

References

External links 
 Elections Division from the Maine Secretary of State
 Campaign contributions at OpenSecrets.org
 Outside spending at the Sunlight Foundation
 Candidate issue positions at On the Issues

Official campaign websites
 Danny Dalton for U.S. Senate
 Cynthia Dill for U.S. Senate
 Andrew Ian Dodge for U.S. Senate
 Angus King for U.S. Senate
 Charles Summers for U.S. Senate
 Steve Woods for U.S. Senate

Senate
2012
Maine